Cunningham Drug is the name of two defunct pharmacy chains:

Cunningham Drug (Canada), originally based in Vancouver
Cunningham Drug (U.S.), originally based in Detroit